Lectionary 31, designated by siglum ℓ 31 (in the Gregory-Aland numbering). It is a Greek manuscript of the New Testament, on parchment leaves. Palaeographically it has been assigned to the 12th-century.

Description 

The codex contains lessons from the Gospels of John, Matthew, Luke lectionary (Evangelistarium). The text is written in Greek minuscule letters, on 281 parchment leaves, 1 column per page, 21 lines per page.

Michaelis remarked some textual similarities to the codices Codex Bezae (e.g. Luke 22:4), Codex Regius, 1 and 69.

Luke 9:35
 It uses the longest reading αγαπητος εν ο ευδοκησα — as in codices C3, Codex Bezae, Codex Athous Lavrensis, ℓ 19, ℓ 47, ℓ 48, ℓ 49, ℓ 49m, ℓ 183, ℓ 183m, ℓ 211;

The manuscript is sporadically cited in the critical editions of the Greek New Testament (UBS3).

Currently the codex is located in the Stadtbibliothek (Ms. Cent. V appendix  No. 40) in Nürnberg.

See also 

 List of New Testament lectionaries
 Biblical manuscript
 Textual criticism

Notes and references

Bibliography 

 Christoph Gottlieb von Murr, Beschreibung der vornehmsten Merkwurdigkeiten  des H. R. Reichs freyen Stadt Nürnberg, Nürnberg 1778. 

Greek New Testament lectionaries
12th-century biblical manuscripts